In mathematics, an exact differential equation or total differential equation is a certain kind of ordinary differential equation which is widely used in physics and engineering.

Definition
Given a simply connected and open subset D of R2 and two functions I and J which are continuous on D, an implicit first-order ordinary differential equation of the form

 

is called an exact differential equation if there exists a continuously differentiable function F, called the potential function, so that

and

An exact equation may also be presented in the following form:

where the same constraints on I and J apply for the differential equation to be exact.

The nomenclature of "exact differential equation" refers to the exact differential of a function.

Example
The function  given by

is a potential function for the differential equation

First order exact differential equations

Identifying first order exact differential equations
Then the differential equation

is exact if and only if

That is, there exists a function , called a  potential function, such that

So, in general:

Proof
The proof has two parts.

First, suppose there is a function  such that

It then follows that

Suppose that 

and let there be a function  for which

In practice, it doesn't matter if you integrate the first or the second equation, so long as the integration is done with respect to the appropriate variable.

where  is any differentiable function such that .

Now to show that it is always possible to find an  such that .

Since ,

Now, this is zero based on our initial supposition that 

Therefore,

And this completes the proof.

Solutions to first order exact differential equations
First order exact differential equations of the form

can be written in terms of the potential function 

where

The solutions to an exact differential equation are then given by

and the problem reduces to finding .

The reasoning behind this is the following. Since

it follows, by integrating both sides, that

Therefore,

By analogy,  must be contained within the expression .

Ergo,

Plugging in into the above equation, we find that

and so  and  turn out to be the same function. Therefore,

Since we already showed that

it follows that

Second order exact differential equations 
The concept of exact differential equations can be extended to second order equations. Consider starting with the first-order exact equation:

Since both functions   are functions of two variables, implicitly differentiating the multivariate function yields

Expanding the total derivatives gives that

and that

Combining the  terms gives 

This leads to the rewritten equation 

Now, let there be some second-order differential equation

If  for exact differential equations, then 

and

Although the sign on  could be positive, it is more intuitive to think of the integral's result as  that is missing some original extra function  that was partially differentiated to zero. 

Next, if

In the second order equation

Let . If , then

So,

and

Thus, the second order differential equation

is exact only if  and only if the below expression

If the equation is exact, then we can reduce to the first order exact form which is solvable by the usual method for first-order exact equations.

Example 
Given the differential equation

one can always easily check for exactness by examining the  term. With one of the conditions for exactness met, one can calculate that 

Letting , then 

Reduction to a first-order exact equation yields

Integrating  with respect to  yields

Differentiating with respect to  gives an equation correlating the derivative and the  term.

So,  and the full implicit solution becomes

Solving explicitly for  yields

Higher order exact differential equations 
The concepts of exact differential equations can be extended to any order. Starting with the exact second order equation

it was previously shown that equation is defined such that

Implicit differentiation of the exact second-order equation  times will yield an th order differential equation with new conditions for exactness that can be readily deduced from the form of the equation produced. For example, differentiating the above second-order differential equation once to yield a third-order exact equation gives the following form

where

and where 
Combining all  and  terms not coming from  gives

Thus, the three conditions for exactness for a third-order differential equation are: the  term must be , the  term must be  and 

Example 
Consider the nonlinear third-order differential equation

Fortunately, this appears in our equation. For the last condition of exactness,

So, the differential equation is exact. Integrating twice yields that . Rewriting the equation as a first-order exact differential equation yields

Integrating  with respect to  gives that .
 and that . The full implicit solution becomes

The explicit solution, then, is

See also
 Exact differential
 Inexact differential equation

References

Further reading 
 Boyce, William E.; DiPrima, Richard C. (1986).  Elementary Differential Equations (4th ed.).  New York: John Wiley & Sons, Inc.  

Ordinary differential equations